Xilp may be:
 Xilp (Unix software): a Unix software, X Interactive ListProc
 used from Island Records to label some long-playing records